Anemosella is a genus of snout moths. It was described by Harrison Gray Dyar Jr. in 1914.

Species
Anemosella basalis Dyar, 1914
Anemosella nevalis (Barnes & Benjamin, 1925)
Anemosella obliquata (H. Edwards, 1886)
Anemosella polingalis Barnes & Benjamin, 1926
Anemosella viridalis (Barnes & McDunnough, 1912)

References

Chrysauginae
Pyralidae genera